Nadim N. Rouhana is Professor of International Negotiation and Conflict Studies at The Fletcher School of Law and Diplomacy at Tufts University and the Founder and General Director of Mada al-Carmel, Arab Center for Applied Social Research in Haifa, which undertakes theoretical and applied social research and policy analysis to broaden knowledge and critical thinking about the Palestinians in Israel, equal citizenship, and democracy.

Early career

Rouhana was born in Isifiya, Mount Carmel, above Haifa to a Palestinian family who were citizens of the state of Israel. He grew up there and was educated in the Israeli school system. He is trilingual, fluent in Arabic, Hebrew, and English. He completed his BA in Psychology and Statistics at the University of Haifa, his MA in Psychology at the University of Western Australia, and his Ph.D. in Social Psychology at Wayne State University.

As part of his graduate work, he spent three years (1981-1984) at Harvard University, writing his dissertation under the mentorship of Dr. Herbert Kelman, and, later, two years (1987-1989) as a postdoctoral fellow. With Kelman, he worked on an approach to conflict resolution called the problem-solving workshop (PSW). Rouhana and Kelman later pioneered a new approach that built on the problem-solving workshop called the continuing workshop. Informed by a socio-psychological approach, the continuing workshop features regular intensive meetings between high-ranking non-official individuals over a long period of time. The meetings are designed to facilitate constructive interaction between opposing parties in an effort to advance jointly formulated ideas on how to address major issues of dispute in a given conflict.

While at Harvard, Rouhana was a founding member of PICAR, a Program on International Conflict Analysis and Resolution that was based at the Weatherhead Center for International Affairs until 2003, and its Chair of Academic Programs. He also served as Co-Chair of the Seminar on International Conflict at the center.

Career 

Before his position at Fletcher, Rouhana was the Henry Hart Rice Professor of Conflict Analysis and Resolution at the School for Conflict Analysis and Resolution (SCAR) at George Mason University (2004-2008) and Director of Point of View, SCAR's international research and retreat center in Mason Neck, Virginia. Prior to that, he was an associate professor at the Department of Sociology and Anthropology at Tel-Aviv University (2000-2004). Appointments previous to this included teaching positions at the University of Massachusetts-Boston, Boston College, and An-Najah National University in Nablus, Palestine.

At Fletcher, Rouhana teaches courses on international negotiation, protracted social conflict, and reconciliation and transitional justice. Current research interests include collective identity and democratic citizenship in multiethnic states, the questions of reconciliation and multicultural citizenship, transitional justice, international negotiations, and the impact of the fusion of religion and nationalism on the comparative dynamics of various protracted conflicts.

Books
Palestinian Citizens in an Ethnic Jewish State: Identities in Conflict 
The Palestinians in Israel. Readings in History, Politics and Society (Eds.) 
Supplemental Readings to the Haifa Declaration: Israel, from a Jewish State to a Democratic State (Ed.) 
Voting Without Voice: The Palestinian Minority in the Israeli Parliamentary Elections, (Ed.)

References

External links
Profile at Program on Negotiation, Harvard Law School 
Profile in the Fletcher School of Law and Diplomacy Directory

Palestinian academics
Living people
The Fletcher School at Tufts University faculty
Tufts University faculty
Israeli emigrants to the United States
1950 births